Vicente Ramos may refer to:
Vicente Ramos Freitas (born 1985), football player
Vicente Ramos Cecilio (born 1947), former basketball player from Spain